Softball competition has been in the Universiade' only in 2007  as optional sport.

Events

Medal table 
Last updated after the 2007 Summer Universiade

References 
International University Sports Federation

 
Universiade